T Normae is a Mira variable star. It is located midway between Eta Normae and Gamma Circini. It ranges from magnitude 6.2 to 13.6 and a period of 244 days. Located around 900 light-years distant, it shines with a luminosity 760 times that of the Sun and has a surface temperature of 3234 K.

References

Mira variables
Norma (constellation)
Normae, T
M-type giants
Durchmusterung objects
077058
140041
Emission-line stars